Egon Ludwig Sedgwick Hanfstaengl ( February 3, 1921 – March 21, 2007) was a German-American art publisher who was also Adolf Hitler's godson and the son of Ernst Hanfstaengl.

Life 
Egon Hanfstaengl was born on February 3, 1921, in New York City as the son of Ernst Hanfstaengl and Helene Hanfstaengl, née Niemeyer. Hitler became his godfather. He had a sister, Hertha, who died at the age of 5. He received his school education in England and Germany, where he also joined the Hitler Youth.

An American citizen by birth, he returned to the United States for his university education. As the son of a prominent former top official of the NSDAP, about whom the American press reported regularly, Hanfstaengl also came into the focus of the reporting. The New York Times announced the admission of the 18-year-old to Harvard University. The newspaper also reported that he volunteered for the United States Army Air Corps in early 1941. The news about Hanfstaengl's entry into the US Army also received attention from Minister of Propaganda Joseph Goebbels; he made a corresponding entry in his diary.

Journalist John Franklin Carter, who, as a consultant to US President Franklin Roosevelt, had psychological assessments prepared of some Nazi leaders, also asked Hanfstaengl's father and his son. When Hanfstaengl started working on a book about the Hitler Youth, Roosevelt, who knew his father, Ernst Hanfstaengl, from studying in Harvard, spontaneously dictated several paragraphs for a foreword, according to Carter's report. According to American records, Hanfstaengl offered Roosevelt to travel to Hitler in the Berghof near Berchtesgaden, in 1943 to attack him, but the White House ignored this suggestion.

After World War II, Hanfstaengl was a lecturer in European and American history at Brooklyn College in New York. He was managing director of the art and publishing house Franz Hanfstaengl in Munich, from 1958 until its dissolution in 1980. As the godchild of Adolf Hitler, he appeared in several documentaries about Hitler.

He died on March 21, 2007, at the age of 86.

Literature 

 Ulrich Chaussy: Zweimal Amerika und zurück nach Bayern: das bewegte Leben des Egon Hanfstaengl. Bayerischer Rundfunk, 2000.

References 

1921 births
2007 deaths
People from New York City
Hitler Youth members
Harvard University alumni
United States Army Air Forces personnel of World War II
American expatriates in the United Kingdom
American expatriates in Germany
Brooklyn College faculty